The Eternal Memory is a 2023 Chilean documentary film directed by Maite Alberdi. The film follows the relationship of Chilean journalist Augusto Góngora and Chilean actress Paulina Urrutia. It was selected in the World Cinema Dramatic Competition at the 2023 Sundance Film Festival where it had its world premiere on 21 January 2023 and won the Grand Jury Prize.

Plot
Chilean journalist and documentary filmmaker Augusto Góngora and Chilean actress have been together for twenty-five years, in 2014, Góngora is diagnosed with Alzheimer's disease. The film includes archival footage from both newsreels and home video, and follows their relationship and struggles making a parallel between the state of Góngora's memory and his life of capturing Chile's memory throughout his career.

Cast
 Augusto Góngora
 Paulina Urrutia

Release
The film was first screened as a part of the World Cinema Dramatic Competition at the 2023 Sundance Film Festival, premiering on 21 January 2023. At the festival, it won the Grand Jury Prize of the competition. Following its premiere, MTV Documentary Films acquired the distribution rights of the film planning a theatrical release. It also screened in the Panorama section at the 73rd Berlin International Film Festival where it had its European premiere.

Reception

Critical reception
On review aggregator website Rotten Tomatoes, the film has an approval rating of 89% based on 18 reviews, with an average rating of 7.8/10. Guy Logde from Variety wrote that the film "treats inexorably sad material with a lighter, more lyrical approach than most". Writing for The Hollywood Reporter, David Rooney called the film "a moving chronicle of a marriage challenged by Alzheimer's", finishing his review commenting that the film is "as unexpectedly stirring as it is sorrowful".

Accolades

References

External links
 
 The Eternal Memory at Berlinale

2023 films
2023 documentary films
Films about Alzheimer's disease
Chilean documentary films
2020s Spanish-language films
2020s Chilean films